Columella columella is a species of minute air-breathing land snail, a terrestrial pulmonate gastropod mollusk in the family Truncatellinidae, the vertigo snails and allies. 

This species is not listed in the IUCN red list and not evaluated (NE) 

Subspecies Columella columella alticola (Ingersoll, 1875)

Distribution 
This species occurs in:
 Poland - critically endangered in southern Poland 
 Slovakia
 Utah, USA (Columella columella alticola)

References

 Kerney, M.P., Cameron, R.A.D. & Jungbluth, J-H. (1983). Die Landschnecken Nord- und Mitteleuropas. Ein Bestimmungsbuch für Biologen und Naturfreunde, 384 pp., 24 plates.
 Sysoev, A. V. & Schileyko, A. A. (2009). Land snails and slugs of Russia and adjacent countries. Sofia/Moskva (Pensoft). 312 pp., 142 plates.
 Bank, R. A.; Neubert, E. (2017). Checklist of the land and freshwater Gastropoda of Europe. Last update: July 16th, 2017

External links 
 Schileyko, A. A. & Rymzhanov, T. S. (2013). Fauna of land mollusks (Gastropoda, Pulmonata Terrestria) of Kazakhstan and adjacent territories. Moscow-Almaty: KMK Scientific Press. 389 pp.

Truncatellinidae
Gastropods described in 1830